Jerrome Roxin Sobers (born 18 April 1986) is an English footballer who plays as a defender.

Career
After beginning his career at Ford United, making his first team debut aged 17, Sobers was spotted and signed by Ipswich Town for £10,000 in the summer of 2004.

He was sent on loan to Brentford in March 2005 and scored on his only appearance as the Bees beat Hull City 2–1 in League One. It was to be Sobers' only appearance on loan at Brentford and he was then released by Ipswich at the end of the 2004–05 season.

Sobers then signed for Chelmsford City, spending two years at the Essex club, before joining Bromley. He then quickly moved onto Braintree Town, but returned to Bromley in 2008, spending nearly four years at the club before signing for Billericay Town in 2011, helping them to win the 2011–12 Isthmian League Premier Division.

Sobers then returned to Bromley in the summer of 2012, but joined Kingstonian on dual-registration in November 2012. He then signed for Isthmian League Division One South promotion-chasers Maidstone United on 16 February 2013. Sobers left Maidstone at the end of the 2013–14 season. Sobers completed a full season with the Stones having joined the season before from Bromley. During this campaign he made 32 appearances in the 2013–14 season.

Sobers joined Tonbridge Angels in June 2014.

Career statistics

Honours 
Bromley

 Isthmian League Premier Division play-offs: 2007

Billericay Town

 Isthmian League Premier Division: 2011–12

Maidstone FC

Isthmian league division one south playoffs

References

External links

1986 births
Living people
English footballers
Redbridge F.C. players
Ipswich Town F.C. players
Brentford F.C. players
Chelmsford City F.C. players
Bromley F.C. players
Braintree Town F.C. players
Billericay Town F.C. players
Kingstonian F.C. players
Maidstone United F.C. players
Tonbridge Angels F.C. players
Hastings United F.C. players
English Football League players
National League (English football) players
Isthmian League players
Association football central defenders
Canvey Island F.C. players
Walthamstow F.C. players